The University of Central Florida first fielded a varsity football team in 1979, and ascended to Division I–A, now known as the Football Bowl Subdivision (FBS), in 1996. The Knights entered an Automatic Qualifying conference in 2013, and won the program's first major bowl game. In 1987, Ted Wilson became the first Knight to be selected in an NFL Draft when he was selected in the tenth round by the Washington Redskins. Since Wilson's selection, thirty-four Knights have been drafted into the National Football League, including four first round selections. The highest a UCF player has been drafted is third overall in 2014, when quarterback Blake Bortles was selected by the Jacksonville Jaguars.

Key

Selections

References

Ucf Knights

UCF Knights NFL Draft